Anatoli Gennadyevich Nezhelev (born 25 May 1985) is a Russian former professional footballer.

Club career
He made his debut in the Russian Premier League in 2005 for FC Shinnik Yaroslavl.

Personal life
His older brother Dmitri Nezhelev also played football professionally.

References

1985 births
Sportspeople from Ashgabat
Living people
Russian footballers
Russian Premier League players
FC Shinnik Yaroslavl players
FC Rotor Volgograd players
FC Salyut Belgorod players
Russian expatriate footballers
Expatriate footballers in Latvia
FC Khimki players
Russian expatriate sportspeople in Latvia
FC Tyumen players
FC Fakel Voronezh players
FC Urozhay Krasnodar players
Association football midfielders
FC Nizhny Novgorod (2015) players
FC Avangard Kursk players
FC Spartak Kostroma players